Meenakshi (sometimes spelled as Minakshi; also known as ,  and ), is a Hindu goddess. She is the tutelary deity of Madurai and is considered an avatar of the goddess Parvati or Durga. She is the divine consort of Sundareśvarar, a form of Shiva. She finds mention in literature as the princess or queen of the ancient Madurai-based Pandya kingdom, and is later deified. The goddess is also extolled by Adi Shankara as Shri Vidya.

She is mainly worshipped in India where she has a major temple devoted to her known as the Meenakshi Temple in Madurai, Tamil Nadu. Meenakshi, Kamakshi, and Visalakshi are considered the three Shakti forms of the goddess Parvati.

Etymology
 is a Sanskrit term meaning 'fish-eyed', derived from the words  'fish' and  'eye'. She was also known by the Tamil name  'fish-eyed one', mentioned in early historical account as a fierce, unmarried goddess Sanskritised as Meenakshi. According to another theory, the name of the goddess literally means 'rule of the fish', derived from the Tamil words  'fish' and  'rule'.

Various meanings of this appellation have been suggested, including that she was originally a goddess of the fisher-folk, that her eyes are "large and brilliant" like that of a fish, or that she has "long and slender" eyes shaped like the body of a fish. Another interpretation is that the name is based on the belief that the fish never close their eyes: the goddess similarly never stops watching over her devotees. Yet another interpretation states that the name is based on the ancient belief that the fish feed their young by merely looking at them; the goddess supposedly supports here devotees by merely glancing at them. There are the three incarnations of Adi Parashakti (Kamakshi), Vishalakshi in the north, and Meenakshi in the south.

Texts

Several great hymns on the goddess were composed in the early modern period by many saints and scholars, including the famous Neelakanta Dikshitar. The stotram Meenakshi Pancharatnam (Five Jewels of Meenakshi), composed by Adi Sankaracharya (8th century CE), is an incantation to her. Meenakshi does not directly appear in the stotram Lalita Sahasranama, though there is a reference to her in the line Vaktralakṣmī parīvāha calan mīnābha ocanā (She who has the face of Lakshmi and has fish-like eyes in the river of her face).

One Tamil poem/song (Tamilpillai) portrays Meenakshi as the intersection of domesticity and divinity:The great Shiva with the metel flower / Wanders through the courtyard of space / Destroying your work again and again / And then he comes before you. // You never get angry. / Every day you just pick up the vessels.

Legend
The 13th century Tamil Shaiva text Tiruvilaiyadal Puranam mentions king Malayadhvaja Pandya and his wife Kanchanamalai, who performed a yajna seeking a son for an heir. Instead, a daughter is born, who is already three-years old, and has three breasts. Shiva intervenes and informs the parents to treat her like a son, telling them that when she meets her husband, she would lose the third breast. They follow this advice. The girl grows up, the king crowns her as his heir. When she meets Shiva, his words come true, she takes her true form of Meenakshi. According to Harman, this may reflect the matrilineal traditions in South India and the regional belief that "penultimate [spiritual] powers rest with the women", gods listen to their spouse, and that the fate of kingdoms rest with the women. According to Susan Bayly, the reverence for Meenakshi is a part of the Hindu goddess tradition that integrates with the Hindu society where the "woman is the lynchpin of the system" of social relationships. Her eyes are fabled to bring life to the unborn.

Meenakshi Temple

The temple complex Madurai, Tamil Nadu in India is dedicated to Meenakshi as the primary deity. It is also referred to as Meenakshi Amman or Meenakshi-Sundareśvarar Temple. Meenakshi's shrine is next to that of her consort Sundareśvarar, a form of Shiva.

Though the temple has historic roots dating back to 2000 BCE, most of the present campus structure was rebuilt after the 14th century CE, further repaired, renovated and expanded in the 17th century by Tirumala Nayaka. In early 14th century, the armies of Delhi Sultanate led by Muslim Commander Malik Kafur plundered the temple, looted it of its valuables and destroyed the Madurai temple town along with many other temple towns of South India. The contemporary temple is the result of rebuilding efforts started by the Vijayanagara Empire rulers who rebuilt the core and reopened the temple. In the 16th century, the temple complex was further expanded and fortified. The restored complex houses 14 gopurams (gateway towers), each above  in height. The complex has numerous sculpted pillared halls such as Ayirakkal (1,000 pillar hall), Kilikoondu-mandapam, Golu-mandapam and Pudu-mandapam. Its shrines are dedicated to Hindu deities and Shaivism scholars, with the vimanas above the garbhagrihas (sanctums) of Meenakshi and Sundareśvarar gilded with gold.

The temple is a major pilgrimage destination within the Shaivism tradition, dedicated to Meenakshi and Shiva. However, the temple includes Vishnu in many narratives, sculptures and rituals as he is considered to be Meenakshi's brother. This has made this temple and Madurai as the "southern Mathura", one included in Vaishnava texts. The large temple complex is the most prominent landmark in Madurai and attracts tens of thousands visitors a day. The temple attracts over a million pilgrims and visitors during the annual 10-day Meenakshi Tirukalyanam festival, celebrated with much festivities and a ratha (chariot) procession during the Tamil month of Chittirai (overlaps with April–May in Georgian calendar, Chaitra in North India).

References

Bibliography

 
 

 
.
.
.
.
.
.
.
.
.
.
.
.
.
.
.
.
.
.

 .

External links
 

Forms of Parvati
Tamil deities